Provogue MensXP Mr India World 2014 was the sixth edition of Mister World India pageant held in Mumbai on  May 8, 2014. Fourteen contestants from all over India were chosen as finalists to compete in the main event in Mumbai. 25 years old Prateik Jain from Bangalore was declared Provogue MensXP Mr India World 2014. 25 years old Puneet Beniwal from New Delhi was declared 1st Runner Up and 23 years old Bharat Raj from Chennai was declared 2nd Runner Up.

Final results
Color key

Special awards
 Special Awards Mr World India 2014

Judges
 Arjun Rampal
 Arjan Bajwa
 Manish Malhotra
 Rocky S 
 Elli Avram

Finalists
 Fourteen finalists were shortlisted from all over India to compete in the main event.

References

2014 beauty pageants
Beauty pageants in India